Josef Maria Horváth (born 20 December 1931 in Pécs, Hungary - died October 21, 2019 in Salzburg, Austria) is a Hungarian composer, pianist, and conductor.

Life
At the Jesuit School of his hometown he learned to play the organ. After high school he studied Piano, Composition, and Conducting at the Liszt Academy in Budapest. In 1956 he was awarded his diploma with distinction, and shortly thereafter settled in neighboring Austria. Here he continued his studies at the Salzburg Mozarteum, concentrating on Piano, Composition, and Electronic Music. During his studies he developed a successful career as a pianist and conductor, frequently offering his own works. After 1962 he diminished his activities as a performer, concentrating almost exclusively on composition. He was also appointed Professor for Counterpoint, Piano, and the Theory and Praxis of New Music at the University Mozarteum in Salzburg. Among his students were the composers Rupert Huber und Laurence Traiger. Horváth's works are of impeccable craftsmanship and great beauty, and have been edited by Doblinger in Vienna.

Selected works
 Passacaglia for string orchestra (1955)
 Redundanz 1, for wind octet (1966)
 Redundanz 2, for string quartet (1967)
 Redundanz 3, for wind octet and string quartet (1968)
 Tombeau de Gigue, for orchestra (1971)
 Melencolia for solo violin solo and orchestra (1972)
 Sothis, for 13 instruments (1977)
 Sonata piccola, for organ (2005)

References

External links
 small bio in German

1931 births
2019 deaths
20th-century classical composers
Hungarian male composers
Austrian classical composers
Austrian male classical composers
20th-century Hungarian male musicians